This is a list of achievements by members of City of Edinburgh Racing Club in national and international competitions.

International Medals Won by Club Members

The following medals have been won by riders representing their country whilst members of the City of Edinburgh Racing Club.

Olympic Games
2000 –  Team Sprint – Chris Hoy, Craig MacLean and Jason Queally

World Championships
1999 –  Team Sprint – Chris Hoy and Craig MacLean 
2000 –  Team Sprint – Chris Hoy, Craig MacLean and Jason Queally 
2011 –  Junior Sprint – John Paul

Commonwealth Games
1986 –  Sprint Eddie Alexander 
2002 –  Team Sprint Marco Librizzi 
2006 –  Points Race – Kate Cullen 
2010 –  Team Sprint – Jenny Davis and Charline Joiner

Medals Won by Club Members in British Championships

1984
 1500 m Grass – Steve Paulding
 20 km Scratch Race – Steve Paulding
 1 km Time Trial – Eddie Alexander
1985
 20 km Scratch Race – Steve Paulding
 1 km Time Trial – Eddie Alexander
 Sprint – Eddie Alexander
 Tandem Sprint – Eddie Alexander and Steve Paulding
1986
 20 km Scratch Race – Steve Paulding
 Sprint – Stewart Brydon
 Tandem Sprint – Stewart Brydon and Steve Paulding
1987
 Sprint – Eddie Alexander
 1 km Time Trial – Eddie Alexander
 Tandem Sprint – Stewart Brydon and Eddie Alexander
 Sprint – Stewart Brydon
 1 km Time Trial – Steve Paulding
1988
 Sprint – Eddie Alexander
 Tandem Sprint – Stewart Brydon and Eddie Alexander
 Sprint – Stewart Brydon
 1 km Time Trial – Eddie Alexander
 1 km Time Trial – Steve Paulding
1989
 Sprint – Stewart Brydon
 1 km Time Trial – Steve Paulding
 Sprint – Eddie Alexander
 1 km Time Trial – Stewart Brydon
 Sprint – Steve Paulding
1990
 Sprint – Stewart Brydon
 1 km Time Trial – Steve Paulding
 Sprint – Steve Paulding
 1 km Time Trial – Eddie Alexander
 Tandem Sprint – Eddie Alexander
1991
 Sprint – Stewart Brydon
 Sprint – Eddie Alexander
 1 km Time Trial – Anthony Stirrat
 Sprint – Steve Paulding
 1 km Time Trial – Steve Paulding
 20 km Scratch Race – Steve Clark
1992
 Sprint – Stewart Brydon
 1 km Time Trial – Anthony Stirrat
 20 km Scratch Race – Anthony Stirrat
 Sprint – Steve Paulding
 1 km Time Trial – Steve Paulding
1993
 Sprint – Stewart Brydon
 Keirin – Stewart Brydon
 Team Sprint – Stewart Brydon, Marco Librizzi, Steve Paulding and Anthony Stirrat
 1 km Time Trial – Anthony Stirrat
 Omnium – Anthony Stirrat
 Tandem Sprint – Marco Librizzi
 1 km Time Trial – Steve Paulding
1994
 Sprint – Stewart Brydon
 20 km Scratch Race – Anthony Stirrat
 Team Sprint – Stewart Brydon, Marco Librizzi, Steve Paulding and Scott McWilliam
 Keirin – Marco Librizzi
 Points Race – Anthony Stirrat
 Tandem Sprint – Marco Librizzi and Steve Paulding
 Team Pursuit – Graeme Heard, Scott McWilliam, Martin Williamson, Nicky Hall and Jamie Henderson
1995
 Sprint – Steve Paulding
 Keirin – Steve Paulding
 Olympic Sprint – Stewart Brydon, Chris Hoy, Steve Paulding and Peter Jacques
 Omnium – Anthony Stirrat
 20 km Scratch Race – Anthony Stirrat
 Team Pursuit – Graeme Heard, Chris Hoy, Martin Williamson, Nicky Hall and Jamie Henderson
 Omnium – Nicky Hall
 1 km Time Trial – Anthony Stirrat
 Points Race – Anthony Stirrat
1996
 Keirin – Peter Jacques
 Olympic Sprint – Craig MacLean, Chris Hoy, Steve Paulding and Peter Jacques
 Sprint – Craig MacLean
 Team Pursuit – Nicky Hall, Chris Hoy, Graeme Heard, Craig MacLean, Martin Williamson and Neil Walker
 Keirin – Craig MacLean
 Sprint – Peter Jacques
 1 km Time Trial – Craig MacLean
1997
 Sprint – Craig MacLean
 20 km Scratch Race – Craig MacLean
 1 km Time Trial – Craig MacLean
 Keirin – Peter Jacques
 Omnium – Peter Jacques
 Olympic Sprint – Craig MacLean, Chris Hoy, Steve Paulding and Peter Jacques
 Team Pursuit – Richard Chapman, Chris Hoy, Scott McWilliam, Craig MacLean, Neil Walker and Steve Whitcome
 Sprint – Peter Jacques
 1 km Time Trial – Chris Hoy
1998
 Sprint – Craig MacLean
 1 km Time Trial – Craig MacLean
 Olympic Sprint – Craig MacLean, Chris Hoy, Peter Jacques and Steve Whitcome
 Omnium – Peter Jacques
 20 km Scratch Race – Peter Jacques
 Sprint – Chris Hoy
 1 km Time Trial – Chris Hoy
 Team Pursuit – Richard Chapman, Nicky Hall, Neil Walker and Steve Whitcome

1999
 Sprint – Craig MacLean
 1 km Time Trial – Craig MacLean
 Omnium – Peter Jacques
 Olympic Sprint – Craig MacLean, James Taylor and Peter Jacques
 Omnium – James Taylor
 1 km Time Trial – Chris Hoy
 Omnium – Craig MacLean
 20 km Scratch Race – James Taylor
 Team Pursuit – Derek Smith, Nicky Hall, Craig MacLean and James Taylor
2000
 Sprint – Craig MacLean
 Keirin – Craig MacLean
 Omnium – James Taylor
 Madison – James Taylor
 Olympic Sprint – Craig MacLean, Chris Hoy and James Taylor
 Sprint – Chris Hoy
 Tandem Sprint – Peter Jacques
 1 km Time Trial – Craig MacLean
 Points Race – James Taylor
 Derny – James Taylor
 Tandem Sprint – Stefan Collins
2001
 Sprint – Craig MacLean
 1 km Time Trial – Craig MacLean
 Olympic Sprint – Chris Hoy, Jason Queally and James Taylor
 Madison – James Taylor
 Points Race – James Taylor
 Omnium – James Taylor
 Points Race – Ross Muir
 Derny – James Taylor
 Team Pursuit – Ross Muir, David Lowe, James McCallum and Richard Chapman
2002
 Omnium – James Taylor
 Madison – James Taylor
 Keirin – James Taylor
 Olympic Sprint – Marco Librizzi, Matthew Haynes and James Taylor
 20 km Scratch Race – James Taylor
2003
 Omnium – James Taylor
 Women's 15 km Scratch Race – Kate Cullen
 Keirin – Matthew Haynes
 Women's Sprint – Kate Cullen
 Women's 500 m Time Trial – Kate Cullen
 Olympic Sprint – Marco Librizzi, James Taylor and Matthew Haynes
2004
 1 km Time Trial – Matthew Haynes
 Madison – James Taylor
 Keirin – Matthew Haynes
 Sprint – Matthew Haynes
 Women's Sprint – Kate Cullen
 Women's Points Race – Kate Cullen
 Women's 15 km Scratch Race – Kate Cullen
 Women's 500 m Time Trial – Kate Cullen
 Olympic Sprint – James Taylor, Graeme Steen, Marco Librizzi and Matthew Haynes
 Keirin – James Taylor
 Omnium – Mark Kelly
 Sprint – Marco Librizzi
2005
 Omnium – Mark Kelly
 Women's Derny – Kate Cullen
 Women's Points Race – Kate Cullen
 Sprint – Marco Librizzi
 Omnium – Anthony Stirrat
 Olympic Sprint – Shane Charlton, Marco Librizzi and Graeme Steen
2006
 Women's Points Race – Kate Cullen
 Omnium – Anthony Stirrat
2007
 Women's Points Race – Kate Cullen
 Women's 15 km Scratch Race – Kate Cullen
 Olympic Sprint – Marco Librizzi
 400 m Grass – Bruce Croall
2008
 400 m Grass – Bruce Croall
 Team Sprint – Kevin Stewart, Matthew Haynes and Bruce Croall
 Women's Team Sprint – Jenny Davis and Charline Joiner
 Women's 800 m Grass – Daisy Sherwood
2009
 Women's 800 m Grass – Daisy Sherwood
 800 m Grass – Bruce Croall
 Tandem Sprint – Matthew Haynes and Bruce Croall
 Women's Team Sprint – Jenny Davis and Charline Joiner
 Omnium – Matthew Haynes
 Team Sprint – Kevin Stewart, Matthew Haynes and Bruce Croall
2010
 1 km Time Trial – Bruce Croall
 Team Sprint – John Paul, Kevin Stewart and Callum Skinner
 Women's Team Sprint – Jenny Davis and Charline Joiner
 Women's Team Sprint – Emma Baird and Kayleigh Brogan
2011
 Women's Team Sprint – Jenny Davis and Kayleigh Brogan
 400 m Grass – Bruce Croall
 800 m Grass – Bruce Croall
2012
 Sprint – Callum Skinner 
 Tandem Sprint –Bruce Croall and Kenneth Ayre 
 1 km Time Trial – Bruce Croall
 Women's Pursuit – Charline Joiner

Junior and Youth

1983
 Junior Sprint – Tom Glen
1988
 Junior Pursuit – Anthony Stirrat
1994
 Junior Sprint – Chris Hoy
2000
 Youth u16 Sprint – Matthew Haynes
 Youth u16 Pursuit – Matthew Haynes
 Youth u16 Scratch Race – Matthew Haynes
 Youth u16 Points Race – Matthew Haynes
 Youth u16 500 m Time Trial – Matthew Haynes
2001
 Junior Scratch Race – Matthew Haynes
 Junior 1 km Time Trial – Matthew Haynes
 Junior Sprint – Matthew Haynes
2002
 Junior 1 km Time Trial – Matthew Haynes
 Junior Sprint – Matthew Haynes
 Junior Scratch Race – Matthew Haynes

2004
 Junior Keirin – Thomas Smith
 Junior 1 km Time Trial – Thomas Smith
2005
 Junior1 km Time Trial – Shane Charlton
2008
 Junior Sprint – Callum Skinner
 Junior Keirin – Kevin Stewart
2009
 Junior Keirin – Kevin Stewart
 Junior Sprint – Kevin Stewart
2010
 Junior Sprint – John Paul
 Junior 1 km Time Trial – Callum Skinner
2011
 Junior Sprint – John Paul
 Junior Keirin – John Paul

Masters

2001
 Pursuit – Ivor Reid
 Scratch Race – Ivor Reid
 Sprint – Marco Librizzi
 Sprint – Ivor Reid
2002
 Sprint – Marco Librizzi
2003
 Scratch Race – Derek Smith
 Sprint – Marco Librizzi
 Points Race – Derek Smith
 1 km Time Trial – Stefan Collins
 Sprint – Stefan Collins
 Scratch Race – Carol Scott
 500 m Time Trial – Carol Scott
2004
 Women's 500 m Time Trial – Carol Scott
 Women's Scratch Race – Carol Scott
 Women's Points Race – Carol Scott

2005
 Women's Points Race – Carol Scott  
 Women's Scratch Race – Carol Scott
 Women's Sprint – Carol Scott
 Women's 500 m Time Trial – Carol Scott
 Women's Pursuit – Carol Scott
2006
 Scratch Race – Anthony Stirrat
 Points Race – Derek Smith
2008
 1 km Time Trial – Bruce Croall
 Sprint – Bruce Croall
2009
 1 km Time Trial – Bruce Croall
 Sprint – Bruce Croall
2010
 Women's Sprint – Louise Haston
 Women's 500 m Time Trial – Louise Haston
 Women's Pursuit – Louise Haston

References 

Sport in Edinburgh
Cycling in Scotland